Samir Nurković (born 13 June 1992) is a Serbian football striker who plays for Durban based PSL Club Royal AM F.C.He has previously played for Pohronie, Slovan Duslo Šaľa, Dunajská Streda ViOn Zlaté Moravce,Kaizer Chiefs as well as for Spartak Vráble.

Club career
Samir was born in Tutin, Serbia and Montenegro. Nurković finished his football formation in Slovakia with Košice, joining the club at the age of 18. He played mainly for the reserve squad.

MFK Košice
On 5 November 2011, Nurković made his Corgoň Liga debut with Košice against ViOn Zlaté Moravce, where he scored the third goal of the match in a 3–2 away loss.

References

External links
 
 Futbalnet profile
 MFK Košice profile

1992 births
Living people
Serbian footballers
People from Tutin, Serbia
Association football forwards
FC VSS Košice players
FC ViOn Zlaté Moravce players
FC DAC 1904 Dunajská Streda players
FK Slovan Duslo Šaľa players
FK Pohronie players
KFC Komárno players
Kaizer Chiefs F.C. players
Slovak Super Liga players
2. Liga (Slovakia) players
3. Liga (Slovakia) players
Expatriate footballers in Slovakia
Expatriate footballers in Austria
Expatriate soccer players in South Africa
Serbian expatriate sportspeople in Slovakia
Serbian expatriate sportspeople in Austria
Serbian expatriate sportspeople in South Africa